Larutia is a small genus of limbless skinks in the family Scincidae.

Species
 Larutia kecil Fukuyama, Hikida, Hossman, & Nishikawa, 2019
 Larutia larutensis (Boulenger, 1900) - black larut skink, Larut Hills larut skink 
 Larutia miodactyla (Boulenger, 1903) - single finger larut skink, Titiwanga larut skink 
 Larutia nubisilvicola Chan-ard, Cota, Mekchai & Lhaoteaw, 2011
 Larutia penangensis Grismer et al., 2011 - Penang Island larut skink
 Larutia puehensis Grismer, Leong, & Yaakob, 2003 - Berumput two-toed skink 
 Larutia seribuatensis Grismer, Leong, & Yaakob, 2003 - two-lined two-toed skink, Seribuat larut skink  
 Larutia sumatrensis Bleeker, 1860
 Larutia trifasciata (Tweedie, 1940) - three-banded larut skink

References

 
Lizard genera
Taxa named by Wolfgang Böhme (herpetologist)